Claudio Gómez Castro, (born 6 April 1980 in San Felipe) is a Chilean lawyer and university professor serving, as a member of the Constitutional Convention, the body in charge of drafting a proposal for a new Chilean constitution.

Background
Gómez earned his law degree from Central University of Chile in 2007, writing his thesis on changes in Chilean labor law. He also holds a master's degree in Democratic Society, State and Law from the University of the Basque Country in Spain. In 2010, he joined the law faculty at Universidad del Aconcagua in San Felipe as professor of political and municipal law.

Public career
Since 2016, Gómez has worked with environmental movements in the Aconcagua region, as well as efforts to for the provinces of Los Andes, San Felipe de Aconcagua, and Petorca to work together.

In 2021, he stood for election in the 6th District of Valparaíso for the Apruebo Dignidad party, earning 8,171 votes and a seat in the convention. During the first three months of the convention, he was a member of the Regulation Commission and is currently part of the State Form and Decentralization Commission.

References

External links
 
 https://www.instagram.com/claudioconstituyente/

Living people
1980 births
21st-century Chilean politicians
Central University of Chile alumni
University of the Basque Country alumni
Members of the Chilean Constitutional Convention